Seleznevo is a rural locality (a village) in Kubenskoye Rural Settlement, Vologodsky District, Vologda Oblast, Russia. The population was 2 as of 2002.

Geography 
The distance to Vologda is 41 km, to Kubenskoye is 11 km. Patrino is the nearest rural locality.

References 

Rural localities in Vologodsky District